Dihammaphora is a genus of beetles in the family Cerambycidae, containing the following species:

 Dihammaphora aepytus Chevrolat, 1859
 Dihammaphora arnaui Bosq, 1951
 Dihammaphora auratopilosa Bruch, 1908
 Dihammaphora auricollis Martins, 1981
 Dihammaphora aurovittata Bates, 1880
 Dihammaphora binodula Chevrolat, 1859
 Dihammaphora bivittata Gounelle, 1911
 Dihammaphora bivitticollis Zajciw, 1964
 Dihammaphora brasileira Napp & Mermudes, 2010
 Dihammaphora brevis Chevrolat, 1859
 Dihammaphora bruchi Aurivillius, 1922
 Dihammaphora chaquensis Bosq, 1951
 Dihammaphora chontalensis Bates, 1872
 Dihammaphora cylindricollis Chemsak & Noguera, 1993
 Dihammaphora dispar Chevrolat, 1859
 Dihammaphora falsa Napp & Mermudes, 2010
 Dihammaphora glabripennis Gounelle, 1911
 Dihammaphora gracicollis Chevrolat, 1859
 Dihammaphora gutticollis Gounelle, 1913
 Dihammaphora hispida Bates, 1885
 Dihammaphora ibirijarai Mermudes, 1998
 Dihammaphora laterilineata Zajciw, 1965
 Dihammaphora lineigera Chevrolat, 1859
 Dihammaphora marginicollis Chevrolat, 1859
 Dihammaphora meissneri Melzer, 1934
 Dihammaphora mineira Napp & Mermudes, 2010
 Dihammaphora minuta Chevrolat, 1859
 Dihammaphora nigrita Chevrolat, 1859
 Dihammaphora nigrovittata Fisher, 1937
 Dihammaphora nitidicollis Bates, 1870
 Dihammaphora parana (Gemminger, 1873)
 Dihammaphora perforata (Klug, 1825)
 Dihammaphora peruviana Martins, 1981
 Dihammaphora pilosifrons Gounelle, 1911
 Dihammaphora pusilla Bates, 1870
 Dihammaphora ruficollis Chevrolat, 1859
 Dihammaphora scutata Gounelle, 1911
 Dihammaphora signaticollis Chevrolat, 1859
 Dihammaphora uncinata Napp & Mermudes, 2010
 Dihammaphora vittatithorax Gounelle, 1911

References

 
Rhopalophorini